Baratia is a genus of bush crickets in the tribe Ephippigerini, described in 2021.

To date, this is a monotypic genus containing the single species Baratia sari Llucià Pomares, 2021, found in Spain.

References

External links 
Image at iNaturalist

Orthoptera of Europe
Ensifera genera
Monotypic Orthoptera genera
Tettigoniinae